The 1989 Japan Series was the Nippon Professional Baseball (NPB) championship series for the 1989 season. It was the 40th Japan Series and featured the Pacific League champion Kintetsu Buffaloes against the Central League champion Yomiuri Giants. Kintetsu barely scraped into the series with a winning percentage only .001 higher than the second place Orix Braves, and Yomiuri won the CL pennant by 8 games to return to the series for the 25th time in franchise history. Played at Fujiidera Stadium and Tokyo Dome, the Giants won the series after losing the first three games to the underdog Buffaloes and staging a miraculous comeback, winning four games in a row with the final two wins coming on the road. Yomiuri slugger Norihiro Komada was named Most Valuable Player of the series. The series was played between October 21 and October 29 with home field advantage going to the Pacific League.

Summary

Matchups

Game 1

Game 2

Game 3

Game 4

Game 5

Game 6

Game 7

See also
1989 World Series

References

External links
 Nippon Professional Baseball—Official website (in English)

Japan Series
Japan Series
Japan Series
Japan Series
Yomiuri Giants
Osaka Kintetsu Buffaloes